Bruno Bürki is Pastor of the Church of Neuchâtel. He is Titular Professor at the University of Fribourg.

References

Academic staff of the University of Fribourg
Swiss Protestant ministers
Living people
Year of birth missing (living people)
Place of birth missing (living people)